Diego Francisco Barisone (29 May 1989 – 28 July 2015) was an Argentine footballer who played for Unión de Santa Fe, Argentinos Juniors and Lanús.

Playing career
Barisone began his senior career for Unión de Santa Fe in 2009. He was contracted to Unión until 2015, with a loan stint at Argentinos Juniors from June 2013 until June 2014.

In January 2015 Barisone transferred to Lanús where he played 17 times until shortly before his death in July 2015.

Death
Barisone died in a car crash on 28 July 2015.

References

1989 births
2015 deaths
Argentine footballers
Club Atlético Lanús footballers
Argentinos Juniors footballers
Unión de Santa Fe footballers
Footballers from Santa Fe, Argentina
Association football defenders
Road incident deaths in Argentina